The Kobayashi Maru is a 1989 Star Trek science fiction novel by Julia Ecklar which has several characters from the Star Trek original series marooned in space on a disabled shuttlecraft. Its title comes from the unwinnable Starfleet Academy training scenario first introduced in the 1982 movie Star Trek II: The Wrath of Khan.

Plot introduction
While stranded in a damaged shuttlecraft, Kirk, Sulu, Chekov, and Scotty recall their Starfleet Academy Command School experiences with The Kobayashi Maru, a training simulation where a cadet has to rescue a crippled fuel freighter by that name from the Klingons, a no-win scenario where any course of action the cadet takes ends in failure. The purpose of the no-win outcome is to test the cadets' response to losing.

The characters in the novel find themselves in a similar no-win scenario of their own.

Plot summary

When communications with the Venkatsen Research Group were lost, the U.S.S. Enterprise was sent to investigate. In a system with 47 planets, the transporter is not usable, so Kirk and crew take a shuttle to Hohweyn VII. En route, a gravitic mine damages the shuttle. Communications and navigation are not responsive, and Kirk and Sulu are injured in the blast. McCoy, in an attempt to pass time, convinces Kirk to tell his story about the Kobayashi Maru and beating the "unwinnable scenario".

Kirk proceeds to tell how he reprogrammed the simulation so that, when Klingon cruisers attack his ship, the Klingon commanders recognize his name and assists Kirk in saving the freighter.

Chekov tells his story about the Kobayashi Maru and a secondary training exercise on an empty space station. Chekov completed the scenario by evacuating his crew and physically ramming the ship into the Klingon attackers. In the second exercise, Chekov commits group "suicide" by "killing" the others who had captured him. The secondary exercise involves pitting all the cadets against each other to see who lasts a pre-determined time period. Chekov creates a different plan. He learns that when Kirk went through the same scenario he organized the cadets in such a way there was no need to fight each other.

Sulu tells his story about his great-grandfather Tetsuo, and about going to Command School for the first time. The first exercise is a type of Model U.N., where Sulu is from a tech level 3 planet, Menak III, and trying to gain entrance into the Federation. When Sulu finds out Tetsuo is discontinuing treatments for a life-ending illness, he refuses to speak to him. Sulu finds out about Tetsuo's death after returning from a field exercise. When he finally takes the Kobayashi Maru test, he decides that the freighter's distress call is probably a trap and chooses not to help it.

Scotty tells about his early years at Command School, and how his love of engineering made it difficult for him to pay attention to non-engineering subjects. Upon taking the scenario, Scotty used engineering solutions to destroy ever increasing waves of Klingon cruisers. Review of his performance shows that he used the Perera Field Theory to destroy the final wave, which was proven to be mathematically possible (thus acceptable to the computer), but physically impossible (as proven by Scotty). The resulting decision had Scotty moved out of Command School and sent to study engineering.

The shuttle is rescued by the Enterprise after a plan to turn the shuttle into an electromagnetic black hole works, which lets the Enterprise know where to find them.

Continuity
Many details about the scenario itself come from the film Star Trek II: The Wrath of Khan.

Reception
Ann-Marie Cahill of BookRiot.com recommend the book as "The Starting Book for Star Trek Novels because it gives us the best character foundations while providing strategic insight to the philosophies of Starfleet Academy itself."

References

External links

1989 American novels
American science fiction novels
1989 science fiction novels
Novels based on Star Trek: The Original Series